Yazbar is a village in Basharyat-e Gharbi Rural District, Basharyat District, Abyek County, Qazvin Province, Iran. In the 2006 census, its population was 334, in 83 families.

References 

Populated places in Abyek County